Covina may refer to:

 Covina, California, a city in Los Angeles County, California, U.S.
 Covina massacre, a 2008 murder–suicide
 Covina (Metrolink station), a Metrolink commuter train station
 Covina-Valley Unified School District, a school district covering five cities in Southern California.

See also 
West Covina, California, a city in Los Angeles County, California, U.S.